The Colonial Theater was a former cinema and stage theater in Allentown, Pennsylvania.  Opened in 1920, for over 50 years it was considered the glamour cinema in the central business district.   It closed in 1982, and was torn down in 2005 after years of being vacant and deteriorated.  The site has been redeveloped as Three City Center, part of the Allentown Neighborhood Improvement Zone (NIZ).

History

Origins
The Colonial Theater was built on the site of the John D. Styles mansion. Styles was a lawyer who represented Pennsylvania in the United States House of Representatives (7th District) during the Civil War.  He remained in politics until the 1870s when he returned to Allentown and practiced law until his death in 1896.   Afterwards, his home was remodeled by his son, Charles Frederick (Fred) Stiles in 1898 who turned it into the Hotel Hamilton.

The Hotel Hamilton suffered a devastating fire during World War I and was later razed, which opened a prime real estate lot on Hamilton Street.  The location for the new theater would be near the Lehigh County Courthouse and a short walk up the street from the trolley junction at 6th and Hamilton.   The Hotel Hamilton was a gathering place for Lehigh County's legal minds and travelers since it was opened, making it a good place for an entertainment venue.

The Colonial Theater was constructed on the site in 1919 when building materials became available again after the end of the war.  Owned by Sidney Wilmer and Walter Vincent of Utica, New York,  the owners had operated the Orpheum Theater in Allentown since 1906.  The Orpheum was renamed The State theater in 1920 when it switched from vaudeville acts to motion pictures; it had made money for Wilmer's and Vincent.  They wanted to open another theater to increase their profits.

The  Ochs Construction Company from Allentown was the general contractor for the building.   The Colonial was designed by Philadelphia architects Hoffman and Henon, who were turning out drawings for the dream palaces of motion pictures.  The building was a concrete and steel three-story  building in the Beaux-Arts style.  Wilmer and Vincent wanted this to be primarily a movie theater and not a vaudeville house.

The interior had a three-story auditorium with two balconies. The marble used was rose Tavernell imported from France. The three grand chandeliers lit the long center ramp that swept up to the interior doors. Set in the marble arches of the columns were baskets of flowers, gifts from Wilmer's and Vincent's many clients in the theater world.

It also contained both ground-floor retail shops as well as second and third-story professional offices for attorneys,  insurance agents and other small businesses, including rehearsal rooms for musicians and acting troupes.

Golden era
The Colonial had its opening night on October 11, 1920.   Its first film was "The Idol Dancer" by D.W. Griffith.  Also on the bill were a Pathe newsreel and a comedy starring silent screen favorite Harold Lloyd entitled "High and Dizzy" Matinee prices for the orchestra and balcony seats were 25 cents, but box seats on Saturday evening would be 65 cents, a high price by the standards of the time. 
 

For most of the next 50-odd years, the Colonial was one of the most profitable and popular theaters in Allentown. Although designed primarily for films, it also was on occasion a performing arts theater.  It was also host for traveling jazz spectaculars, specializing in touring groups from Harlem's Cotton Club.  In 1929, the theater installed sound equipment for talking pictures.  In February 1935, it was the site of a live national radio network broadcast of "Amos and Andy".

It was remodeled in 1937; seats were added, new projection equipment installed and a new air conditioning system put in place, just in time for a big event of 1938. By that time Walter Vincent was chairman of the board of Hollywood film studio Republic Pictures. It was his idea to make a film about the city called "Allentown On Parade".

Along with a Republic Pictures romance called "Army Girl", the film on Allentown premiered on the night of August 18, 1938. Before a capacity crowd on the flag-draped stage of the Colonial Theater, a coast-to-coast phone conversation between Allentown community leaders and the stars of "Army Girl" was broadcast throughout the theater. In an era when a cross-country phone call was a big deal, hearing the live voices of Hollywood stars was quite an event.   In 1944, the property was sold to Fabian Theaters, Inc., which operated a chain of thirty theaters in New York and New Jersey.

Decline
After World War II, the Colonial gradually became a cinema-only facility; however, it continued to host an occasional stage show until the 1960s.   But the advent of television in the 1950s caused revenues to decline as more and more people began to stay home and watch entertainment in their living rooms.   Nevertheless, in 1954 the screen was replaced with one capable of showing CinemaScope widescreen films.

In the early 1960s, the theater was closed for a major renovation.  Its front facade was cleaned and painted, the lower facade re-tiled, and a new marquee was installed.  Inside,  new theater seats were installed on the first floor, along with new carpeting and gold and blue draperies; the walls were re-plastered and a new ceiling was installed.   Two new lounges were added to the main floor and a new RCA stereo sound system was added. The grand opening in October 1962 was the film Barabbas.

During the 1960 and early 70s, the Colonial was the premiere theater in downtown Allentown, showing such films as Cleopatra; Mary Poppins; Doctor Zhivago; Guess Who's Coming to Dinner; Midnight Cowboy (The only "X" rated film ever shown there); M*A*S*H; The Godfather, and The Godfather Part II.

In 1973, United Artists Eastern Theaters Inc. purchased the building from the Fabian movie chain.  However, during the 1970s and 1980s, the multi-cinema mall theaters and also the decline of the Allentown Central Shopping district on Hamilton Street led to austere times for the Colonial, along with other Hamilton Street theaters in Allentown.  The Rialto Theater at 10th and Hamilton closed in the late 1970s,  the Eric Twin, which opened in 1969 about a block east, was renovated into a multi-cinema of six screens,  all of which were capable of projecting 70mm films,  while the Colonial was a single-screen capable of only 35mm film projection.  This meant that many of the Hollywood blockbuster films of the era were shown at other theaters.  By the mid-1970s,  the theater was reduced to charging $1.00 admissions to second and third-run films.   The end was reached in 1982 when the theater closed on September 23d, 1982.

Mark Mendleson
After it closed,  it was announced that it was a temporary closure until a new owner could be found.  Also it was only the cinema part of the building which was closed, as the professional offices and some retail space remained open.     However negotiations with several cinema chains fell through and the theater remained closed for several years.   
 
In 1988, the property was sold to Mark Mendleson, an investor from Philadelphia.   In the time while it was closed, the building sustained water damage from a leaking roof. Again in need of renovation and losing money, Mendleson closed the building for "temporary repairs" that shuttered the professional offices and retail space.  However, instead of renovating the property, property records also show that in spite of their inactivity and deterioration,  the Colonial, along with other properties owned by Mendleson, were used as collateral for tens of millions of dollars in loans for other projects he was involved in.    The closed theater, judged as viable as an operable business by the City of Allentown in 1987,  began to structurally deteriorate.   Mendelson, in turn, laid the blame for his troubles in Allentown on the city's economic woes and on city officials who he said tortured him with unfulfilled promises and turned their backs when he needed help.

For the better part of the next 15 years, Mendleson and the City of Allentown were at loggerheads with regards to the Colonial and his other properties, all of which were deteriorating.  When Allentown gained national infamy in 1990 by making the very bottom of Money Magazine's ranking of 300 places to live in the United States, the Colonial Theater illustrated the city's ignominy with a single photograph. The picture was captioned A vacant movie theater in Allentown.
 
In 1994, with nearly $5 million in liens against his properties in Allentown, the Colonial went to a tax sale. Mendelson gambled that no one would bid on the property — thus becoming responsible for the unpaid bills — and won. At that time, Mendelson began to make amends by paying some of the Colonial's back taxes.     In 2001, the City ordered the Colonial Theater sealed to keep vagrants out of the property, and Mendleson was ordered to repair its roof and make other structural repairs due to the deterioration of the property and to prevent structural collapse. The city fought for years to take control of the long-blighted theater, and obtained a court order in 2003, prying it from the grip of the Mendelson Family Trust.

The Colonial Theater was demolished by the city in March 2005.  Along with the Colonial theater building, the city also razed some vacant early 20th century buildings known as the "Colonial Annex" and the former Allentown Trust building at 527 Hamilton which were next to the former theater building.   Once one of the city's largest banks, it was built about 1905,  In June 1931, the bank had 12,000 depositors and one million dollars in assets.  The run on the banks during the Great Depression forced the bank to close and the Commonwealth of Pennsylvania took over the affairs of the failing bank in June 1932. The building was then used for many years afterwards as offices for Lehigh County until being shuttered about 1988.  With the demolition of the vacant properties, a large empty lot was created between the Old Lehigh Country Courthouse and Law Street.  The city then graveled over the empty lots and the land remained vacant for several years.

The legal issues around the former Colonial Theater building remained for several years until 2008, when the Mendleson Trust settled its dispute with the city over the value of the seized property and payment of city tax liens on that and other properties connected to Mendelson.  Once the settlement was reached, the large empty lot on the north side of Hamilton Street was offered for sale by the city.   After several attempts by the city to sell the vacant lot to several developers, in July 2013 an agreement was made to sell the property to the City Center Development Corporation.

Redevelopment
In April 2014, construction began on Three City Center, a seven-story, $50 million office/retail building on the former Colonial theater and Allentown Trust Company sites as announced by the City Center Corporation.  The Three City Center building is a five-story building that includes 110,000 square feet of retail and office space. It was designed to blend in with surrounding architecture and has two fronts, one on the 500 block of Hamilton Street and the other facing the city's Arts Park.  It opened in May, 2015.

See also
 List of historic places in Allentown, Pennsylvania

References

External links
 Colonial Theater
 Colonial Theater Demolition, 2005

Buildings and structures demolished in 2005
Buildings and structures in Allentown, Pennsylvania
Demolished buildings and structures in Pennsylvania
History of Allentown, Pennsylvania
Music venues completed in 1920
Theatres completed in 1920